Canfield is an unincorporated community in Braxton County, West Virginia, United States.

Some say the community was named after B. T. Canfield, a local farmer, while others believe Canfield has the name of an early postmaster.

References

Unincorporated communities in Braxton County, West Virginia
Unincorporated communities in West Virginia